Aznab, also rendered as Aznavi, may refer to:
Aznab-e Khaleseh, East Azerbaijan Province
Aznab, Qazvin
Aznab, Zanjan
Aznab-e Olya (disambiguation)
Aznab-e Sofla (disambiguation)